Nou 24 was the third channel launched by Ràdio Televisió Valenciana on 3 February 2009, under the name "24/9".

The channel was dedicated to informative programmes made by RTVV and it could be watched only in the Valencian region via digital terrestrial television. Every 30 minutes, on the hour and at half past the hour, there was an informative programme with the most important news of the day. Between these informative programmes there also were other programmes about interviews, videos, docs etc.

All programmes were in Valencian, unlike sister channel Canal Nou, which broadcasts in Valencian and Spanish.

In 2010 the channel was renamed Canal Nou 24 and, in October 2013, as part of a group-wide rebrand, its name was shortened to Nou 24.

It was disbanded along with Canal Nou and the whole of Ràdio Televisió Valenciana just one month later after a labor force adjustment plan that sacked the 75% of the company's personnel was nullified by the National Court, making it untenable.

References

External links 
Official website

Radiotelevisió Valenciana
Defunct television channels in Spain
Mass media in the Valencian Community
Catalan-language television stations
24-hour television news channels in Spain
Television channels and stations established in 2009
Television channels and stations disestablished in 2013
Mass media companies disestablished in 2013